The Lithuanian Football Cup 2008–09 was the 20th season of the Lithuanian annual football tournament. The competition started on May 7, 2008 with the First Round games and ended on May 16, 2009 with the Final. The defending champions were Kaunas.

First round
In this round entered 38 teams from Lithuanian third, fourth and fifth division. The games were played on May 7 – 11, 2008.

|}
1Teams did not arrive to the pitch.

Second round
This round featured 19 winners from the previous round and 5 teams from the Lithuanian second division (LFF I lyga). The matches were played on June 1 – 6, 2008.

|}

Third round
In this round entered winners from the previous round as well as 4 other LFF I lyga teams. The games were played on July 2 – 9, 2008.

|}

Fourth round
In this round entered winners from the previous round together with 2 remaining LFF I lyga teams and 6 lowest-placed 2007 LFF Lyga teams. 2 out of 6 2007 LFF Lyga were relegated to the Lithuanian second division while the rest remained in A lyga. The games were played on August 20 – 27, 2008.

|}

Fifth round
This round featured winners from the previous round. The games were played on September 12 – 17, 2008.

|}

Quarterfinals
In this round entered winners from the previous round and teams placed first to fourth in 2007 LFF Lyga. The games were played on October 1, 2008.

|}

Semifinals
The first legs were played on April 8, 2009. The second legs were played on April 22, 2009.

|}

Final

External links
 Official site 
 omnitel.net
 futbolas.lt 

Cup
Cup
Lithuanian Football Cup, 2008-09
Lithuanian Football Cup seasons